GZS may refer to:

 Abernathy Field, serving Pulaski, Tennessee
 Chamber of Commerce and Industry of Slovenia
 Giani Zail Singh Campus College of Engineering & Technology, in Bathinda, Punjab, India